East Kilbride may refer to:

 East Kilbride, the town in the South Lanarkshire council area of Scotland
 East Kilbride Holyrood constituency, the constituency of the Scottish Parliament created in 1999
 East Kilbride Westminster constituency, the historic constituency of the House of Commons of the Parliament of the United Kingdom, 1974 to 2005